Future Virology is a monthly peer-reviewed medical journal published by Future Medicine. The editor-in-chief is Mark Wainberg (McGill University). The journal covers all types of virus, both from the perspective of human health (vaccines and disease prevention, disease treatment, and drug resistance. The journal was established in 2006 and is published by Future Science Group.

Abstracting and Indexing 
The journal is abstracted and indexed by Biobase, Chemical Abstracts, Embase/Excerpta Medica, Science Citation Index Expanded, and Scopus. According to the Journal Citation Reports, the journal has a 2020 impact factor of 1.831, ranking it 30th out of 33 journals in the category "Virology".

References

External links
 

Publications established in 2006
English-language journals
Virology journals
Future Science Group academic journals
Monthly journals